Fedagh  is one of the villages of Gerash rural district in Gerash county in Fars province in Iran. The people of Fedagh are Ashomi, of Aryan Persian ethnic origins and of Zoroastrian religious background, who converted to Islam (Shia) around the 11th century A.D. and after invasion of Iran by the Arabs. Fedagh has a population of 6,533. The other names are Fadagh Fidagh, Fadagh and Fadaq. Fedaghi people speak Ashomi of lari language with Fedaghi dialect. Fedagh is most advanced village in south west Iran for education & tech, Fedagh students have achieved most high grade in maths & physic in Iran with more than 50 students who are first 1000 in Iran universities.

Geographical Location 
Fedagh is in the south of Fars province and west of Gerash county. It is located between Arad, Beyram, Evaz and Emad Deh. Fedagh is situated 785 meters above the sea level. Fedagh has two Dams, one old from over 1500 years ago and a new one in east of Fedagh with fishing and amuzment facilities.

Weather Condition 
The Weather is hot and dry at summer and cold at winter. Spring and Autumn weathers are moderate and pleasant.

Balangestan 
Balangestan is an agricultural place with dates and lime trees and nice weather 5 km north of Fedagh in South Zagros mountains.

See also 

Gerash
Fars province

Populated places in Fars Province
Gerash County